Dannelbourg is a commune in the Moselle department in Grand Est in north-eastern France.

History 
The commune was part of the principality of Phalsbourg and Lixheim. It was ceded to France in 1661 in accordance with the Treaty of Vincennes. 

Dannelbourg was integrated into Alsace-Lorraine following the French defeat in the Franco-Prussian War of 1870, then returned to France following the First World War in 1918.

Historical, cultural and architectural heritage 
Gallo-Roman remains are observable in the village.

The church Saint-Jean-Baptiste, built during the 19th century. It houses an old organ from the basilica Saint-Epvre in Nancy.

See also 
 Communes of the Moselle department

References

External links
 

Communes of Moselle (department)